Hopewell is a former unincorporated community in Mississippi County, Missouri, United States. It was a small settlement in northeastern Ohio Township.

References

Former populated places in Mississippi County, Missouri
Ghost towns in Missouri